Umjindi was a local municipality of the Ehlanzeni District in Mpumalanga, South Africa.  Barberton was the seat of the municipality. The municipality had a population of 53,744 according to the 2001 census.

Main places
The 2001 census divided the municipality into the following main places:

Politics 
The municipal council consists of eighteen members elected by mixed-member proportional representation. Nine councillors are elected by first-past-the-post voting in nine wards, while the remaining nine are chosen from party lists so that the total number of party representatives is proportional to the number of votes received. In the election of 18 May 2011 the African National Congress (ANC) won a majority of fifteen seats on the council.
The following table shows the results of the election.

This municipality was dissolved on 3 August 2016 and annexed by the Mbombela Local Municipality.

References

External links
Government website

Local municipalities of the Ehlanzeni District Municipality